Gransart is a surname. Notable people with the surname include:

Maurice Gransart (1930–2013), French footballer
Roland Gransart (born 1954), French footballer and manager